The MTV Asia Awards 2006 was held at the Siam Paragon in Bangkok, Thailand. The show aired live on Saturday, May 6 across Asian MTV channels. Like previous award shows, the show is best known for live performances featuring collaborations of Eastern and Western act. The show was hosted by Wang Leehom together with Kelly Rowland replacing Kelly Clarkson.

Performers

Korn
Wang Leehom
Kelly Rowland
Thaitanium & Simon Webbe
Lee Ryan & Tata Young
Jolin Tsai
Daniel Powter
Teriyaki Boyz
Hoobastank
Rivermaya
Kangta & Vanness

Presenters
Zhao Wei
Maggie Q
Same Same
Taufik Batisah
Too Phat
Lukkade Metinee
Sean Noh
The Veronicas
Ahli Fiqir
Peter Corp
Marsha Vadhanapanich
Jal
Chang Chen

International awards

Favorite Pop Act

Black Eyed Peas
Gorillaz
Simple Plan
Backstreet Boys
Westlife

Favorite Rock Act

Coldplay
Franz Ferdinand
Green Day
My Chemical Romance
Oasis

Favorite Video

Franz Ferdinand — "Do You Want To"
Green Day — "Wake Me Up When September Ends"
Kanye West — "Gold Digger"
Korn — "Twisted Transistor"
My Chemical Romance — "Helena"

Favorite Female Artist

Ashlee Simpson
Kelly Clarkson
Lindsay Lohan
Madonna
Mariah Carey

Favorite Male Artist

Eminem
James Blunt
Kanye West
Ricky Martin
Robbie Williams

Favorite Breakthrough Artist

Fort Minor
James Blunt
Simon Webbe
The Pussycat Dolls
My Chemical Romance

Regional awards

Favorite Artist Mainland China
The Flower
Sun Nan
Zhao Wei
Xu Wei
Zhou Xun

Favorite Artist Hong Kong 
Andy Lau
Eason Chan
Joey Yung
Leo Ku
Twins

Favorite Artist India
Abhijeet Sawant
Asha Bhosle
Jal
Rabbi Shergill
Sonu Nigam

Favorite Artist Indonesia
Maliq & D'Essentials
Peterpan
Project Pop
Radja
Rossa

Favorite Artist Korea 
Buzz
Seven
SG Wannabe
Tei
Wheesung

Favorite Artist Malaysia 
Ahli Fiqir
Fish Leong
Mawi
Ruffedge
Too Phat

Favorite Artist Philippines
Bamboo
Hale
Kitchie Nadal
Orange and Lemons
Rivermaya

Favorite Artist Singapore
A-do
Huang Yida
JJ Lin
Taufik Batisah
Stefanie Sun

Favorite Artist Taiwan
5566
Jay Chou
Jolin Tsai
S.H.E
Wang Leehom

Favorite Artist Thailand
4gotten
Bodyslam
Lydia
Tata Young
Thaitanium

Special awards

The Style Award
Jolin Tsai

Outstanding Achievement in Popular Music
Destiny's Child

The Inspiration Award
Thongchai McIntyre

Breakthrough Collaboration Japan Award
Teriyaki Boyz

Award theme
The award had a futuristic Asian looks. Soldiers with (fake) laser guns would escort presenters onto the stage. After each commercial break there were animation skits set in a future Asia.

See also
MTV
MTV Asia Awards
MTV Asia

References

External links
Official Site
MTV Asia article before the award show
MTV Asia article summary of the award show
Codehunters (the animation at the award shows)

2006 music awards
MTV Asia Awards